The following is a list of footballers who have played for the Russia national football team.

Players

References

 
Association football player non-biographical articles